Georgescu is a Romanian surname. Notable people with the surname include:

 Andrei Georgescu, soccer player
 Dudu Georgescu, soccer player
 Dumitru Georgescu-Kiriac, composer and conductor
 Elena Georgescu, coxswain
 Haralamb H. Georgescu, architect
 George Georgescu, conductor
 George Georgescu (mathematician), mathematician
 George Georgescu (water polo), water polo athlete
 Judith Georgescu, can-can dancer
 Justin Georgescu, communist activist and anti-fascist militant
 Mihai Georgescu, rock music singer
 Nicholas Georgescu-Roegen, economist and statistician
 Paul Georgescu, literary critic, novelist and communist activist
 Peter Georgescu (1939- ), former Young & Rubicam executive 
 Pimen Georgescu, Metropolitan of Moldavia
 Teohari Georgescu, communist politician
 Vlad Georgescu, historian and journalist

Georgesco 
 Christopher Georgesco

See also 
 Gheorghe
 Gheorghiu

Romanian-language surnames
Patronymic surnames
Surnames from given names